ACME Laboratories may refer to:

 The ACME Laboratories Ltd, a Bangladeshi pharmaceutical company
 ACME Laboratories, open source software host of Jef Poskanzer

See also
 Acme (disambiguation)